Varana may refer to:

 Varana, Gujarat, a village in India
 , a village in Levski Municipality, Bulgaria

See also 
 Vanara
 Varna (disambiguation)